The Pat Day Mile Stakes is a Grade II American Thoroughbred horse race for three-year-olds held on dirt over a distance of one mile scheduled on Kentucky Derby Day at Churchill Downs in Louisville, Kentucky. The current purse is $500,000.

History

Race name
Originally, the event was known as the Derby Trial Stakes and was held one week before the Kentucky Derby. It was first run in 1924 and every year since, with the exception of 1928.

The race name was given similar to races in Britain which preceded the Epsom Derby such as
the Investec Derby Trial (now Blue Riband Trial Stakes) and Lingfield Derby Trial and in Australia, the Geelong Derby Trial Stakes (now known as the Geelong Classic).

In 2015, this race was renamed to the Pat Day Mile Stakes (in honor of the Hall of Fame jockey, Pat Day) and moved to the undercard of Kentucky Derby day. Its purse was increased from $150,000 to $200,000. In 2016, the purse was raised to $250,000.

From 2010 through 2012, it had been named the Cliff's Edge Derby Trial.

Distance and class
The distance was reduced between 1977 and 1981 to 7 furlongs. And once again the distance from 2007 to 2009 was  furlongs.  The Derby Trial Stakes was an ungraded event from 2006 to 2008.

Winners of the Trial and Derby
Four trainers have won the Derby Trial and the Kentucky Derby with the same horse. The feat was accomplished by Hanley Webb in 1924 with Black Gold and by Ben A. Jones who did it twice, first with the great Citation in 1948 and then with Hill Gail in 1952. Eddie Hayward won both in 1953 with Dark Star and in 1958 Jimmy Jones, son of Ben, became the fourth and last to do it when he won the two races with Tim Tam. Since Tim Tam, the gradual trend in training has been toward giving Derby contenders fewer prep races and more time between them.  This practice has all but eliminated the Trial as a legitimate Derby prep race.  Even the 1982 decision to move it from the Tuesday before the Derby to the Saturday before didn't help.

However, the three weeks between the Trial and the 1 3/16ths-mile Preakness in Baltimore is perfect.  In recent years, the Trial has sent the Preakness such horses as Key to the Mint (1972), No More Flowers (1987), Houston (1989), Honor Grades (1991), Alydeed (1992), Cherokee Run (1993), Numerous (1994), Our Gatsby (1995), Black Cash (1998), Patience Game (1999), Sir Shackleton (2004), Flying First Class (2007), Macho Again (2008), and Pleasant Prince (2010).

Although none of those Trial horses won the Preakness, Alydeed, Cherokee Run and Macho Again finished second at Pimlico Race Course and Key to the Mint finished third. And two of trainer Woody Stephens' Trial winners Caveat in 1983 and Creme Fraiche in '85 went on to win the Belmont Stakes (GI).  Additionally, the 2008 Belmont Stakes was won by Da'Tara, trained by Nick Zito, who finished in fifth place in the 2008 Derby Trial Stakes.

Calumet Farm had three horses that finished second in the Trial. In 1941, Whirlaway finished second to Blue Pair in the Trial, but then roared back to win the Triple Crown. In 1949, Ponder was second to Olympia in the Trial, but came back five days later to take the Derby by three lengths over Capot.

In 1957, Middleground finished second in the Trial to Black George on a muddy track, but won the Kentucky Derby later on a fast track.

And then there was the ill-fated Gen. Duke in 1957.  He came to Churchill Downs touted as a potential superstar, but finished second to Federal Hill in the Trial. Then, the morning of the Derby, Gen. Duke was scratched because of a foot injury suffered in the Trial.

In 1967, Barb's Delight became the last Trial horse to have a significant impact on the Derby, finishing second by a length to longshot Proud Clarion.  Don't Get Mad finished fourth in the Derby in 2005.

The last horse to win the Saturday before the Derby and then win the roses was Cannonade in 1974.  But the race he won was the now-defunct 7f Stepping Stone Purse, not the Derby Trial.

Losers of the Trial and winners of the Derby
Several Kentucky Derby winners failed to win the Trial, but bounced back to win the "Run for the Roses." Most notable of those were Calumet Farm's Iron Liege, who finished fifth in the Trial and returned to defeat a Kentucky Derby field that included champions Gallant Man, Round Table and Bold Ruler and is generally considered to be the greatest field in Derby history.  King Ranch's Assault finished fourth in the Trial, but returned to win the Derby and sweep the Triple Crown.  In 1941, Triple Crown winner Whirlaway finished second in the Derby Trial, but returned to sweep the Derby, Preakness Stakes and Belmont Stakes.

Records
Speed record
 1:28.45 - Macho Again (2008) (at distance of  furlongs)
 1:34.18 - Competitive Edge (2015) (at distance of one mile)

Most wins by a jockey
 4 - Eddie Arcaro (1948, 1949, 1952, 1959)
 4 - Pat Day (1987, 1991, 1993, 2000)

Most wins by a trainer
 5 - Ben A. Jones (1943, 1947, 1948, 1951, 1952)

Most wins by an owner
 9 - Calumet Farm  (1943, 1947, 1948, 1951, 1952, 1956, 1958, 2017, 2018)

Winners

See also
Road to the Kentucky Derby

References

 The 2009 Derby Trial Stakes at the NTRA

Churchill Downs horse races
Flat horse races for three-year-olds
Triple Crown Prep Races
Graded stakes races in the United States
Recurring sporting events established in 1924
1924 establishments in Kentucky
May events
Grade 3 stakes races in the United States